Andryein Tamir (born April 24, 1986) is a Mongolian swimmer. At the 2004 Summer Olympics, he competed in the men's 100 metre freestyle, finishing in 64th place.  At the 2012 Summer Olympics, he competed in the Men's 100 metre freestyle, finishing in 49th place overall in the heats, failing to qualify for the semifinals.

References

External links
 

Mongolian male freestyle swimmers
Living people
Olympic swimmers of Mongolia
Swimmers at the 2012 Summer Olympics
Swimmers at the 2002 Asian Games
Swimmers at the 2006 Asian Games
1986 births
Swimmers at the 2004 Summer Olympics
Asian Games competitors for Mongolia